Leo John Reding (June 6, 1924 – October 12, 2015) was an American politician.

Born in Austin, Minnesota, Reding received his bachelor's degree in physical education from the University of St. Thomas. He taught high school and was a meat cutter at the Hormel Plant. Reding served on the Austin city council and as mayor of Austin, Minnesota. From 1975 to 1995, Reding served in the Minnesota House of Representatives and was a Democrat.

Minnesota’s GLBT Human Rights Act Amendment

In 1993, Minnesota passed the first GLBT civil rights laws to include full legal protection for transgender people, as well as gay, lesbian, and bisexual persons. Representative Reding co-authored this bill with Representative Karen Clark after attending a PFLAG meeting and hearing first hand stories of injustice and discrimination.

As documented in Lavender Magazine on the  15th anniversary of the bill's passage:

Clark relates that then-Representative Leo Reding, a moderate-to-conservative DFLer from Austin, asked her, “Hey, Karen, are you going to do that gay rights bill again this year?” She answered, “Yes, Leo, I am,” thinking, “Oh, God, here it comes.” Reding replied, “Good, because I want to be a coauthor with you.”

Reding explained to Clark that constituents and longtime friends had invited him to a meeting of the local chapter of Parents and Friends of Lesbians and Gays (PFLAG). Hearing the experiences of people he knew helped change his mind.

Notes

1924 births
2015 deaths
People from Austin, Minnesota
University of St. Thomas (Minnesota) alumni
Educators from Minnesota
Minnesota city council members
Mayors of places in Minnesota
Democratic Party members of the Minnesota House of Representatives